An election was held on November 6, 2018 to elect all 41 members to Delaware's House of Representatives. The election coincided with the elections for other offices, including U.S. Senate, U.S. House of Representatives and state senate. The primary election was held on September 6, 2018.

Democrats consolidated their majority in the House by gaining one seat, winning 26 seats compared to 15 seats for the Republicans.

Results

Statewide

District
Results of the 2018 Delaware House of Representatives election by district:

References

Delaware House of Representatives
House of Representatives
2018